During World War II, the United States Army Air Forces had two major airfields in Delaware.   They were:
 Dover Army Air Field, 4 miles southeast of Dover, Delaware
 Assigned to First Air Force
 18th Observation Squadron (65th Obsn Gp), 2 March 1942 – 23 March 1942
 80th Bombardment Squadron (Medium)(45th Bomb Gp), 29 April 1942 – 15 July 1942
 Hq and Hq Sq, 45th Bombardment Group (Medium), 16 May 1942 – 27 July 1942
 39th Bombardment Squadron (Medium)/ 3rd Antisubmarine Squadron (Heavy), 19 July 1942 – 28 February 1943
 312th Base Headquarters and Air Base Squadron, 16 September 1942 – 10 April 1944
 365th Fighter Group (Single Engine), 11 August 1943 – 18 November 1943
 83rd Fighter Group (Single Engine), 22 November 1943 – 10 April 1944
 125th Army Air Force Base Unit, 10 April 1944 – 31 March 1946
 Now:  Dover Air Force Base

 New Castle Army Air Base, 1 mile west of New Castle, Delaware
 Assigned to First Air Force
 62nd Pursuit Squadron (Interceptor)(56th Purs Gp), 10 December 1941 – 17 January 1942
 4th Pursuit Squadron (Interceptor)/ 4th Fighter Squadron (52nd Ftr Gp), 27 April 1942 – 12 June 1942
 Assigned to Ferrying Division, Air Transport Command 
 344th Air Base Squadron / 344th Base Headquarters and Air Base Squadron, 29 May 1942 – 31 March 1944
 2nd Ferrying Group, 29 May 1942 – 4 December 1945
 552nd Army Air Force Base Unit, 31 March 1944 – 31 December 1945
 1596th Army Air Force Base Unit, 1 December 1944-November 1945
 Was: New Castle Air National Guard Base
 Now: New Castle Airport (ILG)

See also 
 First Air Force
 United States Army Air Forces

References
 Maurer, Maurer (1983). Air Force Combat Units Of World War II. Maxwell AFB, Alabama: Office of Air Force History. .
 Ravenstein, Charles A. (1984). Air Force Combat Wings Lineage and Honors Histories 1947-1977. Maxwell AFB, Alabama: Office of Air Force History. .
 Thole, Lou (1999), Forgotten Fields of America : World War II Bases and Training, Then and Now - Vol. 2.  Pictorial Histories Pub .

External links

 01
World War II
Airfields of the United States Army Air Forces in the United States by state
United States World War II army airfields